Ho-1 was a Japanese autocannon used during World War II, it was a Type 97 20 mm anti-tank rifle adapted for use in bomber turrets.

Fixed or not
The cannon when fixed was known as the Ho-3, compared to its flexible brother the Ho-3 was fed with a 50-round double drum, while the Ho-1 was fed by a 15-round magazine.

Specifications
Caliber: 20 mm (0.8 in)
Ammunition: 20 x 125 (164 g) Armor-piercing tracer or high-explosive incendiary 
Weight: 33 kg (72 lb) 
Rate of fire: 300-400 rounds/min
Range 900 m
Muzzle velocity: 820 m/s (2,690 ft/s)

References

20 mm artillery
Autocannon
Aircraft guns